Emma Jones may refer to:
Emma Jones (poet) (born 1977), Australian poet
Emma Jones (journalist) (born 1975), Welsh journalist
Emma Jones (cyclist), English cyclist
Emma Jones (footballer, born 1982), Welsh footballer
Emma Jones (footballer, born 1994), England-born Welsh footballer
Emma Jones (naturalist) (1835–?), New Zealand author, botanist and painter
Emma Jones (cricketer), English cricketer
Emma Jones (1813–1842), British painter with the married name Emma Soyer